Olena or Yelena Bondarenko may refer to:

 Olena Anatoliivna Bondarenko (born 1974), Ukrainian Party of Regions politician 
 Olena Fedorivna Bondarenko (born 1955), Ukrainian Batkivshchyna politician 
 Yelena Bondarenko (born 1968), Russian politician

See also
 Alona Bondarenko, (born 1984), Ukrainian tennis player